Aranda is a surname of Spanish origin. Notable people with the surname include:

Alejandro Aranda (born 1994), known by his stage name Scarypoolparty, American singer, musician, and reality television personality
Ana Teresa Aranda (born 1954), Mexican politician 
Ángel Aranda (1934–2000), Spanish actor
Antonio Aranda (1888–1979), Spanish general
Ariel Aranda (born 1988), Argentine footballer
Arturo Aranda (born 1998), Paraguayan footballer
Carlos Aranda (born 1980), Spanish footballer
Clara Aranda (born 1988), Swedish politician
Dave Aranda (born 1976), American football coach, current head coach of Baylor University
Eduardo Aranda, (born 1985) Paraguayan footballer
Emmanuel de Aranda (c.1612–c. 1686), Dutch traveler, historian and poet
Francisco Aranda Millán (1881–1937), Spanish zoologist
Gabriel Aranda (born 2001), Argentine footballer 
Gilda Aranda (born 1933), Mexican swimmer
Humberto Aranda (born 1966), Costa Rican boxer
Idalberto Aranda (born 1975), Cuban weightlifter
Ingrid Aranda (born 1992), Peruvian karateka
Jonathan Aranda (born 1998), Mexican baseball player
Jorgelina Aranda (1942–2015), Argentine actress, television personality and model
José Jiménez Aranda (1837–1903), Spanish painter
Juan Aranda (born 1988), Spanish footballer
Juan Ignacio Aranda (born 1962), Mexican actor
Julieta Aranda (born 1975), Mexican artist
Luis Aranda (born 1936), Argentine boxer
Manuel Aranda da Silva, Mozambican politician
Mara Aranda (born 1968), Spanish singer
Nathalee Aranda (born 1995), Panamanian long jumper
Óscar Aranda (born 2002), Spanish footballer
Pablo Aranda (footballer) (born 2001), Argentine footballer
Pablo Aranda (writer) (1968–2020), Spanish writer
Pedro de Aranda, 15th century bishop of Calahorra
Pedro Pablo Abarca de Bolea, 10th Count of Aranda (1718–1798), Spanish 18th century statesman and diplomat
Philip Aranda (1642–1695), Spanish Jesuit theologian
Ramón Aranda (born 1966), Paraguayan long-distance runner
Rene Aranda (born 1990), American actress
Samuel Aranda (born 1979), Spanish photojournalist
Vicente Aranda (1926–2015), Spanish film director

Spanish-language surnames